Tunisia competed at the 2022 World Games held in Birmingham, United States from 7 to 17 July 2022. One athlete represented Tunisia at the 2022 World Games. Karateka Chehinez Jemi won the bronze medal in her event and the country finished in 70th place in the medal table.

Medalists

Competitors
The following is the list of number of competitors in the Games.

Karate

Tunisia won one bronze medal in karate.

Women

References

Nations at the 2022 World Games
2022
World Games